Gerald Paul "Jerry" Hirshberg (June 30, 1940 – November 10, 2019) was an American automotive designer, industrial designer, musician and painter.

Early life and education
Hirshberg studied mechanical engineering at Ohio State University and received a degree with honors in Design from the Cleveland Institute of Art. After graduation, he continued to study in Europe on a Mary C. Page Fellowship. During college, under the stage name Jerry Paul, he released the hit single "Sparkling Blue" in 1959 and opened for well-known musicians such as Bobby Rydell, Fabian, and Frankie Avalon. Hirshberg's first automobile was a Volkswagen Beetle.

Automotive design
Hirshberg started his career in automotive design with General Motors in 1964, where he created designs for the Pontiac and Buick divisions under Bill Mitchell. The most distinctive GM design from Hirshberg was the 1971 "boattail" Buick Riviera, where he was tasked with interpreting Mitchell's original concept. By the time he departed GM, he was the Buick/Pontiac chief designer. Regarding his time at GM, Hirshberg recalled in 1999 that "[the car design trend] was certainly sexual, but it was the sexual fantasies of men. When we lapsed, we were doing design pornography."

In 1980, Hirshberg left GM after being recruited to join Nissan, where he served as the founding director and eventual President of their first design studio in the United States, Nissan Design International (NDI), based in La Jolla, California. In 1982, NDI had thirty employees, which Hirshberg called an "experiment in intercultural creativity." NDI, along with Toyota's Calty studio, were some of the earliest California-based automotive design studios established by foreign and domestic manufacturers throughout the 1970s and 80s.

NDI took on several commissions outside automotive design in order to stay creative, including the commercially successful "Bubble Burner" golf club line for nearby TaylorMade, a yacht, and a computer for RDI Computer Corporation.

In 1999, Mickey Kaus attributed Nissan's poor sales performance throughout the 90s to the "loser designs" produced by NDI under Hirshberg. However, earlier in 1999, Hirshberg had stated that Nissan had been directing conservative designs from Japan since the early 90s after the marketplace failure of the Infiniti J30.

By the late 90s, approximately 75% of Nissan vehicles marketed in the United States were designed at NDI. In 1999, Hirshberg served as the spokesman for Nissan advertising in America. He retired from Nissan at the end of June 2000, turning down a potential promotion to Nissan's global design chief, and continued to pursue artistic interests in retirement.

Credited designs
Hirshberg is credited with creating or assisting with the following designs:

 1967 Pontiac Firebird
 1968 Pontiac GTO
 1971 Buick Riviera
 1985 Nissan Pathfinder
 1987 Nissan Pulsar NX
 1990 Nissan Gobi (concept)
 1991 Nissan NX
 1992 Infiniti J30
 1992 Nissan Altima
 1992 Nissan Quest
 1995 Nissan Sentra
 1999 Nissan Xterra
 1999 Nissan 240Z Concept

Death
On November 10, 2019, Hirshberg died at his home at the age of 79 after a year-long battle with glioblastoma, a type of brain cancer.

References

External links
 
 
 
 . Hirshberg introduces the Z Concept at 1999 NAIAS

1940 births
2019 deaths
20th-century American Jews
General Motors people
Nissan people
Artists from Cleveland
People from Del Mar, California
American automobile designers
21st-century American Jews